The 2016 Montana Grizzlies football team represented the University of Montana in the 2016 NCAA Division I FCS football season. The Grizzlies were led by second-year coach Bob Stitt and played their home games on campus at Washington–Grizzly Stadium. Montana participated as a member of the Big Sky Conference, of which they are a charter member. They finished the season 6–5, 3–5 in Big Sky play to finish in eighth place.

Schedule

Source: Official Schedule

Game summaries

Saint Francis (PA)

@ Northern Iowa

@ Cal Poly

Southern Utah

Mississippi Valley State

Sacramento State

@ Northern Arizona

@ Eastern Washington

Idaho State

@ Northern Colorado

Montana State

Ranking movements

References

Montana
Montana Grizzlies football seasons
Montana Grizzlies football